Yair Clavijo (4 January 1995 – 21 July 2013) was a Peruvian footballer who played as central defender for Sporting Cristal and the Peru national under-18 football team (a preparatory squad for the Peru national under-20 football team).

Death
Clavijo died of a cerebral edema caused by underlying cardiac condition during a game on 21 July 2013 at the age of 18.

Response 
Clavijo's death sparked discussions on the safety of high-altitude football games. Some, including footballer Roberto Palacios, expressed opposition to games played in high-altitude stadiums. Others, such as footballer Luis Guadalupe, claimed that adaptation to high-altitude locations was possible and that health risks should be evaluated through proper medical screenings from the clubs on their players.

In 2018, the Lima, Peru Superior Court ruled Sporting Cristal had to pay Clavijo's family an indemnification of US$160,000.

References

1995 births
2013 deaths
Peruvian footballers
Association football central defenders
Association football players who died while playing
Sport deaths in Peru